Hadži-Zaharija (ca. 1760–March 15, 1830) was Metropolitan of Raška and Prizren from 1819 to 1830.

Biography
Zaharija was born around 1760 in the village of Vince, near Kumanovo in modern-day North Macedonia. In order to get education, he went to school of the Serbian Orthodox Monastery of Dečani in the region of Metohija. He was noticed as bright and pious by archimandrite Danilo Kažanegra. He joined the Monastery and later went with his archimandrite on a pilgrimage to Jerusalem in 1794 (hence he was called hadži-Zaharije, from Turkish hacı, "pilgrim"). After the death of archimandrite Danilo, he became the next archimandrite of Dečani.

In that time, Monastery of Dečani was one of the most important monasteries in Eparchy of Raška and Prizren, so after the death of Metropolitan Joanikije (Janićije) of Raška and Prizren in 1818, the local Serbs insisted that Zaharija would succeed him. After Mahmud-pasha Rotulović of Prizren, a local plenipotentiary, agreed to it and Zaharija was sent to Constantinople to be consecrated.

His work as Metropolitan of Raška and Prizren came in troublesome times.  During the Greek Uprising (1821) several monks of Visoki Dečani were hanged while Zaharija was imprisoned for almost a year.

He died in on March 15, 1830, and was buried in Visoki Dečani monastery. He was the last ethnic Serb serving as Metropolitan of Raška and Prizren for almost a century (until 1896), since all of his successors were ethnic Greeks.

In some recent historical works, Zaharija was wrongly attributed with consecrating future metropolitan Petar II Petrović Njegoš of Montenegro into lower orders in 1831, but that was done by his successor Ananije, since in that time Zaharija was already dead.

References

Sources

 
 

19th-century Serbian people
Bishops of Raška-Prizren
People from Kumanovo
Serbs of North Macedonia
1830 deaths
18th-century births
Year of birth unknown